The Tax Administration Service is the revenue service of the Mexican federal government. The government agency is a deconcentrated bureau of the Secretariat of Finance and Public Credit, Mexico's cabinet-level finance ministry, and is under the immediate direction of the Chief of the Tax Administration Service. The SAT is responsible for collecting taxes, as well as applying fiscal and customs law, with the purpose of funding public spending in a proportional and equitable manner. Additionally, it is the bureau's responsibility to generate and collect information necessary for the formation and evaluation of fiscal policy.

History 

On 15 December 1995, the Law of the Tax Administration Service was published in the Official Journal of the Federation, through which the new bureau was established, endowing it with the highest fiscal authority. In March 1996, a new organic structure for the Secretariat of Finance and Public Credit was authorized and registered, which brought about a number of changes in the organisms and dependencies of the ministry that dealt with taxation, including the General Information, Development, and Evaluation Administration and the General Directorate of Tax Policy.

The SAT officially began operations on 1 July 1997, with the internal bylaws published on 30 June that same year. The Tax Administration Service substituted the Undersecretariat of Income. In addition, the creation of the new bureau gave rise to the establishment of several different administrative units, as well as a number of state and local administrative dependencies for the purposes of federal tax collection, fiscal auditing, revenue and customs law, as well as the redistribution of federal resources.

Composition 

The SAT is composed of a Governing Board, which constitutes its primary decision-making body; the eleven general administrations and units which make up the bureau; and a Chief of the Tax Administration Service, who is appointed and removed by the President with the approval of the Senate. The Chief of the SAT is the primary link between the bureau and the rest of the departments and bureaus which make up the executive branch of the Mexican federal government, as well as all other government entities at the state and local levels, private and social sector actors.

The Governing Board of the SAT is made up of the following individuals:

 Arturo Herrera Gutiérrez as Secretary of Finance;
 Three counsellors appointed by the former from within the finance ministry; and
 Three independent counsellors appointed by the President, two of whom must have been nominated by the National Committee of Fiscal Officials in accordance with the Law of Fiscal Coordination.

Additionally, the general administrations which make up the SAT are as follows:

 Customs
 Taxpayer Services
 Federal Tax Auditing
 Large Taxpayers
 Legal
 Revenue
 Resources and Services
 Communication and Information Technology
 Evaluation
 Planning
 Foreign Trade Auditing

These, together with the various state and local administrative units make up the main body of the Tax Administration Service.

References

External links 
 Sitio del Servicio de Administración Tributaria
 SAT página informativa
 SAT portal de informacion
 Sitio de la Secretaría de Hacienda y Crédito Público
 Todo acerca del SAT
 Estructura Orgánica del SAT
 Directorio de Servidores Públicos del SAT
 Plan Estratégico 2007-2012

Government agencies established in 1995
1995 establishments in Mexico
Government agencies of Mexico
Paseo de la Reforma